Return to Oz is a 1964 animated television special produced by Crawley Films for Videocraft International. It first aired on 9 February 1964 in the United States on NBC's The General Electric Fantasy Hour block, then later aired on syndication from 1965 to the 1990s and on the Disney Channel in 1995. It was directed by F. R. Crawley, Thomas Glynn and Larry Roemer from a teleplay by Romeo Muller, who later wrote Dorothy in the Land of Oz. This was the first special produced by Arthur Rankin Jr. and Jules Bass of Rankin/Bass Productions (the soon-to-be renamed Videocraft International).

Crawley Films also produced the earlier 1961 animated series Tales of the Wizard of Oz and brought similar artistic character renditions to the special. There is also a 1985 live-action Disney film of the same name.

In the special, Dorothy and Toto arrived back at Oz, after they received a letter from one of her Oz friends wanting her back, only to later be warned by a good witch, Glinda, regarding the Wicked Witch of the West, who has been restored back to life, and cast the dark spell by erasing her friends' abilities and kidnapping the Wizard of Oz for her revenge plot on Dorothy to steal away her magic silver slippers. So along with the assist of her Oz pals, Dorothy and Toto must journey to foil and rid Oz of the Wicked Witch for good.

Plot

The plot is virtually a retelling of the storyline of  The Wonderful Wizard of Oz; however, as this is a sequel to the animated series Tales of the Wizard of Oz, in which Dorothy and the gang went through an entirely different series of adventures, this adventure is new to them all. All of Dorothy's friends become trapped in the situations they were in when she first met them, meaning that they all must visit the Wizard as they did in the pilot for the TV series. Dorothy receives a letter from the Scarecrow, called Socrates in the special, as in the series, telling her that everyone is happy with the gifts the Wizard gave them and that they miss her very much. She goes to find her magic Silver Shoes and is instantly taken back to Oz again by another Kansas twister, this time not by house, but an apple tree. Once she arrives there, she is greeted by the Munchkins in Munchkinville. Glinda arrives to tell her that the previously melted Wicked Witch of the West has become reconstituted and is wreaking havoc again, having taken Socrates' diploma and burned it, destroyed the heart of the Tin Woodman, called Rusty, by turning herself into a Tin Woman, and dropping him into a pond where he rusted over again. She has also stolen the medal that belonged to the Cowardly Lion, called Dandy, and turned it into a daisy, and is planning to get Dorothy's silver shoes again.

Dorothy sets off to find her friends, without knowing the Wicked Witch is watching them in her Crystal Ball. She finds and oils Rusty who has rusted after the Witch tricked him. They find Socrates in a cornfield on a pole scaring crows again and get him down. They find Dandy crying, and after some unexpectedly cruel bullying from Socrates and Rusty, they cheer him up.  After the four friends are reunited, they arrive at the Emerald City, only to be tricked by the Witch, who has captured the Wizard and taken over as the ruler of Oz. The Wizard, who in this continuity is not an Omaha huckster but an Ozite born and bred and the elected ruler of Oz, tells them to destroy her again and he will give them what they want. She arrives back at her castle just before Dorothy and her friends, but before they arrive she sends flying alligators to kill them. Socrates' quick thinking saves them as they hide under his straw (a method employed in more than one of the Oz books). Rusty saves them from a lightning bolt by sacrificing himself, which kills him, despite his being made of tin. Dorothy asks Glinda if she will help and a glowing ball brings him back to life. They arrive and are trapped by the Witch. She grabs Dorothy and tries to take her silver slippers. The gang (including the Wizard himself) tries to get her back from the Witch, who gives her and Dandy the slippers. Dorothy, who is being held upside-down from the window, tells Dandy that he will turn to stone if he takes them, but he takes them anyway without being turned to stone. The Witch takes them only to be turned into stone, crumble, and fall apart. The gang returns to the Emerald City, only to find out that the Wizard is, after all, a humbug, unable as he always was to return Dorothy home. Glinda appears to tell Dorothy the reason that her friends didn't turn to stone, because they had brains, a heart, and courage. She also explains that the Witch was cruel and heartless, brainless enough to think that evil could conquer good and cowardly in that she used slaves and suppressed others. Dorothy wishes to go back, and instantly, a Kansas twister whisks her and Toto back home to Aunt Em and Uncle Henry again.

Characters
The following characters appear in the special, with associated voice actors:

 Dandy Lion (Cowardly Lion) and The Wizard of Oz – Carl Banas
 Dorothy Gale – Susan Conway
 Dorothy Gale (singing) – Susan Morse (not to be confused with the film editor of the same name)
 Glinda, the Good Witch of the North – Peggi Loder
 Rusty the Tin Man (Tin Woodman) and The Wicked Witch of the West – Larry D. Mann
 Socrates the Strawman (Scarecrow) – Alfie Scopp
 Toto – Stan Francis

Production
Return to Oz was produced as a 90-minute successor to the Tales of the Wizard of Oz series, although edited to fit an hour-long time slot for NBC's broadcast. The screenplay originated from New York while the voice track was recorded in Toronto at RCA Victor studios. The animation consisted of 140,000 images drawn by 40 staff members at the Crawley studios in Canada.

Video/DVD
Return to Oz was released on VHS in the late 1980s by Prism Entertainment.  It was released on DVD by Sony Wonder and Classic Media in March 2006.  It had previously been available for syndication, and a few local stations picked it up.

See also
List of American films of 1964
Adaptations of The Wizard of Oz – other adaptations of The Wonderful Wizard of Oz

References

External links
 
 The Enchanted World of Rankin/Bass

1960s American animated films
1960s animated television specials
1964 in animation
Television series based on The Wizard of Oz
Animated films based on The Wizard of Oz
1964 television specials
1964 in American television
1960s American television specials
1964 animated films
NBC television specials
Rankin/Bass Productions television specials
Television shows written by Romeo Muller
Canadian animated television films
1964 films
1960s Canadian films